France Bleu Occitanie is a public radio station in the France Bleu network for Toulouse and surrounding areas. The station broadcasts in the Haute-Garonne department on 91.8 MHz from Toulouse. France Bleu Toulouse is based in the former Toulousian studios of Le Mouv' after that station moved its primary studios to Paris.

France Bleu Toulouse started broadcasting on 23 February 2011 at 6 a.m. after a 2-month delay (it was originally planned to start broadcasting 14 December 2010), after a dispute between local independent radio stations and Radio France for using the 90.5 FM frequency.

On December 12 2017, the name was changed to France Bleu Occitanie as part of a regional coverage expansion and the opening of a series of new transmitters. The Toulouse frequency was switched from 90.5 to 91.8 MHz, with the CSA granting 90.5 to 100% Radio. That week, three frequencies in Auch, Pamiers and Saint-Gaudens were opened. From 2018, the station slowly enlarged it's coverage zone. by broadcasting its programs in the following towns: Albi, Cahors, Carmaux, Castres, Figeac, Mazamet (frequency preemption), Montauban (frequency preemption), Rodez and Villefranche-de-Rouergue.

References

External links
France Bleu
Radio France Website

Radio stations in France
Radio stations established in 2011
Radio France